The 8th Miss Nepal Pageant for 2002 was held at the Birendra International Convention Centre.  There were protests by pro-women activists.

Malvika Subba was crowned Miss Nepal 2002 on December 7, 2002 at Birendra International Convention Center. Pinky Shah and Lhamo Yangchen Sherpa won the titles of 1st Runner up and 2nd Runner up respectively.

Results

Color keys

Sub-Titles

Contestants

External links
 Miss Nepal 2002 website
 Miss Nepal website

 
Beauty pageants in Nepal
2002 in Nepal
Miss Nepal